The Green Guide was a bi-monthly publication produced by the National Geographic Society as an information resource on eco-conscious and healthy living. Founded in 1994, it ceased publication in 2008, and now exists as a website only. The quarterly National Geographic Green Guide magazine was an evolution of the pre-existing Green Guide Web site and bimonthly newsletter, founded in 1994 by former Natural Resources Defense Council staff scientist Wendy Gordon.

History and profile
The Green Guide was started in 1994. The magazine launched website in 2002. The National Geographic Society bought the magazine in March 2007. It was relaunched by the company as a general consumer quarterly in March 2007. The magazine was cut down with its March 4, 2008 issue to a quarterly publication. It ceased publication in late 2008. 

It was printed sustainably on Verso Paper with FSC Mixed Source Label, meaning the wood comes from Forest Stewardship Council-certified, well-managed forests, sources controlled in accordance with FSC standards, and/or recycled material. In addition to the traditional printed publication, The National Geographic Green Guide was available as a digital subscription using Texterity’s Web publishing format.

References

External links
The Green Guide  Not a valid link anymore - this redirects to a bridal site

Bimonthly magazines published in the United States
Online magazines published in the United States
Quarterly magazines published in the United States
Defunct magazines published in the United States
Environmental magazines
Magazines established in 1994
Magazines disestablished in 2008
Newsletters
Online magazines with defunct print editions